William José de Souza (born 7 October 1986, in Goiânia), commonly known as Amaral, is a Brazilian footballer who plays as a defensive midfielder.

He made his professional debut for Goiás in a 3–1 home win over Fluminense in the Campeonato Brasileiro on 30 August 2006 and scored his first professional goal for Goiás in a 3–1 home win over Palmeiras in the Campeonato Brasileiro on 17 June 2007.

Honours
Goiás
Campeonato Goiano: 2006, 2009, 2012, 2013
Campeonato Brasileiro Série B: 2012

Palmeiras
Copa do Brasil: 2015

Chapecoense
 Campeonato Catarinense: 2017

References

External links

1986 births
Living people
Brazilian footballers
Association football midfielders
Campeonato Brasileiro Série A players
Campeonato Brasileiro Série B players
Goiás Esporte Clube players
Sociedade Esportiva Palmeiras players
Coritiba Foot Ball Club players
Associação Chapecoense de Futebol players
Sportspeople from Goiânia